Rugby union in Western Australia describes the sport of rugby union being played and watched in the state of Western Australia. First introduced some time in 1868 it was the most popular football code until it was overtaken by Australian rules football in Western Australia in 1885. After a period of decline and recess between 1905-1927 it grew throughout the 20th century. The governing body is the Western Australia Rugby Union (RugbyWA).

Rugby clubs are centred on the metropolitan Perth and Fremantle, the game is uncommon elsewhere. Despite being the second most popular code with spectators, rugby has the distinction of holding the record attendance of any football code in the state, with 61,241 attending the Bledisloe Cup at Optus Stadium in 2019.

Western Australia is the home of the Western Force, a franchise in the Super Rugby competition since 2006.  Their home ground is NIB Stadium, which has a capacity of 20,500 spectators. The development team is the Perth Spirit, which has competed in the Australian Rugby Championship in 2007 and the National Rugby Championship since 2014.

History

Early history: 1860-1892

Rugby was first played in the Colony of Western Australia in the late 1860s and early 1870s.

One of the earliest matches was played in 1868 in Fremantle by a team from West Yorkshire Regiment against a local sides in Perth on the grounds of the Bishop’s Collegiate School.

Rugby was the leading football code in the colony up until the mid 1880s before its popularity was overtaken by Australian rules football.

In 1885 one of the leading rugby clubs, Fremantle, decided to switch codes. It was quickly joined by three other clubs - , Victorians, and a team of schoolboys from The High School. Rugby was to suffer considerably from this exodus in the latter 1880s.

Rugby Revival and Interstate matches: 1893-1905

The 1890s however saw a revival in West Australian rugby and it continued to be played by a small number of clubs sufficient to form the Western Australian Rugby Union in 1893. A 4 team competition commenced in 1895 with the I Zingari, Fremantle, Swans and Midland Junction Club's taking part. These clubs were joined by a Goldfields Association consisting of the Coolgardie Rugby Football Club and Kalgoorlie Rugby Football Club (Goldfields) (1896). Other Perth based clubs to form later included the Pirate Football Club (1898) and Metropolitan Rugby Football Club (1900).

At the turn of the 20th Century, Rugby was rapidly growing in popularity, with a combined Metropolitan vs Districts matches being played interstate matches including the Goldfields and a schools competition begun.

From 1905, Perth, Pioneers and Swan competed for the Levinson Cup, the competition was able to gain access to play on Australian rules football grounds and crowds grew to thousands with some games rivaling the popularity of Australian rules.

Decline and Hiatus: 1905-1927
Competition in Perth ceased around the end of 1905, though the game continued to be played in the Goldfields region, particularly by the Kalgoorlie Rugby Club. In 1907, a combined Goldfields team hosted the New South Wales team which defeated them 16 to 7 in front of a large crowd.

The popularity of rugby faded slowly, with only sporadic competition. Though teams from Sydney continued to tour and promote the game Western Australia's rugby teams were not nearly competitive against New South Wales, however Western Australia's Australian Football team proved it could be competitive against Victoria taking out the Jubilee Australasian Football Carnival in 1908. While the school competitions were initially thriving, the code suffered substantially with the successful introduction of Australian Football into Western Australian schools with junior numbers virtually non-existent. As rugby in the remote mines also faded, Australian rules clubs were beginning to incorporate some of the rugby rules including vigorous tackling.

In the face of dwindling numbers, in Perth only two clubs remained: Fremantle and Central. Matches were played at the Esplanade. A visiting Sydney side played Central in June 1909 in front of a large crowd at the Esplanade.

Modern revival: 1928-

Rugby had not been played in WA for 23 years however it was revived in June 1928 when two teams contested a match in Perth. It was followed by a restarted school competition and the formation of Perth and Fremantle clubs who played at Cottesloe. They were joined by a Northern Suburbs team.

A state team was once again assembled in 1929 to compete against a visiting team from the HMAS Canberra. Rugby in 1930 was once again attracting record crowds, and a 4 team competition was in full swing. The competition was strong enough to field a West Australian team to compete against the touring Great Britain however they were beaten 71 to 3 in front of a crowd of 6,000.

Rugby was relegated to a minor sport until it experienced a revival in the 2000s aided by international migration.

Notable players
Bob Thompson first player selected to play for the Wallabies from a WA Club
John Welborn (retired, first Western Australian born to represent the Wallabies) - NSW Waratahs, Leicester Tigers, CA Brive, Western Force, Australia
Brett Sheehan - NSW Waratahs, Queensland Reds, Western Force, Australia
Adam Wallace-Harrison - ACT Brumbies, Australia A
Kieran Longbottom - Western Force
Dane Haylett-Petty - Western Force, Australia under-19, Australia
Scott Higginbotham - Queensland Reds, Melbourne Rebels, Australia
David Collis - Queensland Reds
Darren Murphy - Queensland A
Will Brock - Perth Spirit, Australia sevens
Daniel Montagu - Nottingham R.F.C., Leicester Tigers
Ryan Tyrrell - Perth Spirit
Dan Bailey - Perth Spirit
Salesi Ma'afu - Western Force, Joondalup Brothers RUFC
Kyle Godwin
John Trend - Perth Spirit

See also

RugbyWA
Perth Spirit
Western Force

References

Sources

External links
 Official website of the WA Rugby
 Official website of the Western Force